Paralaudakia microlepis, the smallscaled rock agama,  is an agamid lizard found in Iran, Afghanistan, Pakistan, and Turkmenistan.

References

Paralaudakia
Reptiles of Central Asia
Reptiles described in 1874
Taxa named by William Thomas Blanford